Stuttgart University station is an underground station on the Stuttgart S-Bahn in the German state of Baden-Württemberg. It was opened on 29 September 1985 to serve the development of the Pfaffenwaldring campus of the Stuttgart University in the district of Vaihingen, an Outer District of Stuttgart. It lies on the main line of the S-Bahn. Its neighbouring stations are Stuttgart Schwabstraße and Stuttgart Österfeld (since 1993). The station has been served since its opening by lines S1, S2 and S3.

Location
The station is on a curve of the railway line and it is particularly deep. From the platforms to the surface three successive sets of stairs or escalators must be used. Alternatively, lifts are used. The station is located in an auditorium building of the university, which was built after the opening of the station. Also Universitätsstraße (University street) runs above the station, near the auditorium building. It provides a connection to federal highway 14 and the district of Büsnau. The bus stop located on the ground above the station is served by several bus lines.

In contrast to the other underground stations in Stuttgart, the University station has platforms outside the tracks. The station walls are painted brown, reflecting the University. There are also motifs representing each faculty.

Rail services
The superimposition of S-Bahn lines S1, S2 and S3 results in a 5-minute interval service in the peak hours and a 10-minute interval service during the off-peak to Vaihingen and to Stuttgart city centre. The station is classified by Deutsche Bahn as a category 4 station.

References

University
Railway stations in Germany opened in 1985
University